E231 may refer to:
 2-Phenylphenol, a food additive
 E231 series, a Japanese train type
 European route E231, a European Class-B road in the Netherlands